The free trade agreements of Canada represents Canada's cooperation in multinational trade pacts and plays a large role in the Canadian economy. Canada is regularly described as a trading nation, considering its total trade is worth more than two-thirds of its GDP (the second highest level in the G7, after Germany). Of that total trade, roughly 75% is done with countries that are part of free-trade agreements with Canada—primarily the United States through the Canada–United States–Mexico Agreement (CUSMA), and its predecessor the North American Free Trade Agreement (NAFTA). By the end of 2014, Canadas bilateral trade hit Can$1 trillion for the first time.

Overview 
Canada is a founding member of the World Trade Organization (WTO) since 1 January 1995.

The North American Free Trade Agreement (NAFTA), which is held with Canada by the United States and Mexico, came into force on 1 January 1994, creating the largest free-trade region in the world by GDP. By 2014, the combined GDP for the NAFTA area was estimated to be over Can$20 trillion with a market encompassing 474 million people.

Building on that success, Canada continues to negotiate and has concluded free-trade agreements with more than 40 countries, most recently with South Korea, which represents Canada's first FTA with a partner in the Asia-Pacific region. As of 2018, Canada has also concluded two other significant multilateral trade agreements: the Comprehensive Economic and Trade Agreement (CETA) with the European Union and the 11-nation Comprehensive and Progressive Agreement for Trans-Pacific Partnership (CPTPP) with 10 other Pacific-Rim countries. On 21 September 2017, CETA was provisionally applied, immediately eliminating 98% of EU's tariff lines on Canadian goods. Canada is currently the only G7 country to have free trade agreements in force with all other G7 countries. Free trade with the final G7 country, Japan, commenced when the CPTPP entered into force on 30 December 2018.

Free-trade agreements

In force or provisionally in force

Under negotiation

Canada is negotiating bilateral FTAs with the following countries and trade blocs:

 (ASEAN)

 Pacific Alliance

Negotiations ended with no plan to restart

, abandoned following the commencement of exploratory discussions for a free trade agreement with ASEAN as a whole
 (CARIBCAN)

Exploratory discussions
Canada is undertaking exploratory discussions of bilateral or multilateral FTAs with the following countries and trade blocs, although formal negotiations have not yet begun:
, abandoned following the detention of Michael Spavor and Michael Kovrig and the extradition case of Meng Wanzhou
, suspended following the Canada–Philippines waste dispute and abandoned following the commencement of exploratory discussions for a free trade agreement with ASEAN as a whole
, abandoned following the commencement of exploratory discussions for a free trade agreement with ASEAN as a whole 
, with no progress since 2013

Abandoned free-trade agreement proposals

Foreign Investment Promotion and Protection Agreements

A Foreign Investment Promotion and Protection Agreement (FIPA) is an agreement to promote foreign investing.

FIPAs in force

The following is a list of FIPAs in force, including date of entry into force.

Canada–Argentina (29 April 1993)
Canada–Armenia (29 March 1999)
Canada–Barbados (17 January 1997)
Canada–Benin (18 January 2013)
Canada–Burkina Faso (11 October 2017)
Canada–Cameroon (16 December 2016)
Canada–China (1 October 2014)
Canada–Costa Rica (29 September 1999)
Canada–Côte d'Ivoire (14 December 2015)
Canada–Croatia (30 January 2001)
Canada–Czech Republic (22 January 2012)
Canada–Ecuador (6 June 1997)
Canada–Egypt (3 November 1997)
Canada–Guinea (27 March 2017)
Canada–Hong Kong (6 September 2016)
Canada–Hungary (21 November 1993)
Canada–Jordan (14 December 2009)
Canada–Kosovo (19 December 2018)
Canada–Kuwait (19 February 2014)
Canada–Latvia (24 November 2011)
Canada–Lebanon (19 June 1999)
Canada–Mali (8 June 2016)
Canada–Mongolia (24 February 2017)
Canada–Panama (13 February 1998)
Canada–Peru (20 June 2007)
Canada–Philippines (13 November 1996)
Canada–Poland (22 November 1990)
Canada–Romania (23 November 2011)
Canada–Russian Federation (27 June 1991)
Canada–Senegal (5 August 2016)
Canada–Serbia (27 April 2015)
Canada–Slovak Republic (14 March 2012)
Canada–Tanzania (9 December 2013)
Canada–Thailand (24 September 2008)
Canada–Trinidad & Tobago (8 June 1996)
Canada–Ukraine (24 June 1995)
Canada–Uruguay (2 June 1999)
Canada–Venezuela (28 January 1998)

FIPAs signed

The following is a list of FIPAs that have been concluded and signed, but have not yet entered into force.

Canada–Moldova (June 2018)
Canada–Nigeria (May 2014)

FIPA negotiations concluded

The following is a list of FIPA negotiations concluded, and are not in force. First is the country, then the date it was concluded.

Canada–Albania (November 2013)
Canada–Bahrain (February 2010)
Canada–Madagascar (August 2008)
Canada–United Arab Emirates (May 2018)
Canada–Zambia (March 2013)

Ongoing FIPA negotiations

The following is a list of FIPA negotiations that have not yet concluded.
Canada–Democratic Republic of Congo
Canada–Gabon
Canada–Georgia
Canada–Ghana
Canada–India
Canada–Kazakhstan
Canada–Kenya
Canada–Republic of Macedonia
Canada–Mauritania
Canada–Mozambique
Canada–Pakistan
Canada–Qatar
Canada–Rwanda
Canada–Tunisia

See also

 Canada's Global Markets Action Plan
 Economy of Canada

Notes

References

 
Foreign trade of Canada